The Copa Mercosur 2001 was the 4th and final staging of the international club cup.

The competition started on 21 July 2001 and concluded on 24 January 2002 with San Lorenzo beating Flamengo in the final.

Participants

 Argentina (6)
Boca Juniors
San Lorenzo
Independiente
Vélez Sársfield 
River Plate
Talleres

 Brazil (7)
Vasco da Gama
Flamengo
Corinthians
Cruzeiro
São Paulo
Palmeiras
Grêmio

 Chile (3)
Universidad Católica
Colo Colo
Universidad de Chile
 Paraguay (2)
Cerro Porteño
Olimpia

 Uruguay (2)
Nacional
Peñarol

Details
 The 20 teams were divided into 5 groups of 4 teams. Each team plays the other teams in the group twice. The top team from each group qualified for the quarter-finals along with the best 3 runners up.
 From the quarter finals to the final, two legs were played in each round. In the result of a draw, the match was decided by a penalty shoot out.

Group stage

Group A

Group B

Group C

Group D

Group E

Ranking of second place teams
The three best second-place teams from the five groups advanced to the quarterfinals along with the five group winners.

Bracket

Quarter-finals

First leg

Second leg

Flamengo won 4–0 on aggregate.

Corinthians won 3–2 on aggregate.

San Lorenzo won 6–3 on aggregate.

Gremio won 2–0 on aggregate.

Semi-finals

First leg

Second leg

San Lorenzo won 5–3 on aggregate.

2-2 on aggregate, Flamengo won 4-2 on penalties

Final

First leg

Second leg
Originally scheduled for Dec 19 but postponed to January 24, 2002 due to social unrest in Argentina

1-1 on aggregate, San Lorenzo won 4–3 on penalties

References

Copa Mercosur
3